Anton Otulakowski (born 29 January 1956) is an English former footballer who played in the Football League for Barnsley, Crystal Palace, Millwall, Southend United and West Ham United.

Otulakowski was born in Dewsbury, and started his League career at Barnsley in Division Four, making his League debut against Hartlepool United in April 1975. He combined his time at Barnsley with working for the Gas Board. In October 1976, he joined West Ham United for £60,000, a record fee received for Barnsley at the time, and made his debut at Old Trafford against Manchester United with The Hammers winning 2–0.

He then joined Southend United in March 1979, where he made 163 League appearances before George Graham signed him for Millwall for a combined total of £60,000 in March 1983, which also included Dave Cusack making the same journey. He won promotion from Division Three in 1985, and was named Player of the Year in 1986.

After a successful spell with Millwall, he signed for Crystal Palace for £19,000 paid for from Palace's Lifeline appeal. After only 12 games, Otulakowski was forced to retire from the professional game due to a persistent knee injury.

Personal life
Otulakowski's father is from Poland and moved to England after World War II.

His uncle, Arthur Thompson played for Huddersfield Town from 1946 to 1949.

References

1956 births
Living people
Association football midfielders
Barnsley F.C. players
Crystal Palace F.C. players
English Football League players
English footballers
English people of Polish descent
Footballers from Dewsbury
Hastings United F.C. players
Millwall F.C. players
Ossett Town F.C. players
Southend United F.C. players
West Ham United F.C. players